Udaya Chandrika was an Indian actress of Kannada cinema from the mid-1960s to the mid-1970s. She also appeared in Tamil, Malayalam and Telugu-language films.

Career
Udaya Chandrika began her career with Katari Veera, released in 1966. She played Dr. Rajkumar's sweetheart in that film. Later, she went on to play many roles in Kannada films till her last appearance in Udugore, released in 1979, with Kalyan Kumar.

She acted with almost all the stars of her time, like Dr. Rajkumar, Kalyan Kumar, Udaykumar, Rajesh, Vishnuvardhan, Srinath, Rajinikanth, etc. She even worked with Sivaji Ganesan, MGR, Prem Nazir, Krishna in her other language films.

She produced two films under her banner Chandrika Films, Asadhya Aliya, starring Vishnuvardhan and Kiladi Aliya, starring Shankar Nag in the lead roles.

Her famous films are Thillana Mohanambal, Katari Veera, Dhoomakethu, Bhoopathi Ranga, Anchusundarikal, Pattukunte Laksha, etc.

Filmography

Kannada

Tamil
 Deivathin Deivam (1962)
 Anandhi (1965)
 Ennathan Mudivu (1965)
 Avan Pithana? (1966)
 Periya Manithan (1966)
 Rajathi (1967)
 Maadi Veettu Mappilai (1967)...Seetha
Thillana Mohanambal  (1968) Minor Singaram's wife 
Penn Deivam
 Oru Thaai Makkal (1971)...Meena
 Engal Thaai (1973)
 Swati Natchathiram (1974)
 Piriya Vidai (1975)
  Dasavatharam  (1976)

Malayalam
 Anchu Sundarikal (1968)
 Inspector (1968)
 Bhaarya Illaatha Raathri (1975)

References

Actresses in Kannada cinema
Indian film actresses
20th-century Indian actresses
Actresses in Tamil cinema
Actresses in Telugu cinema
Actresses in Malayalam cinema